Olcott-Newfane Airport  is a privately owned, public use airport located two nautical miles (4 km) southwest of Olcott, a hamlet in the Town of Newfane, Niagara County, New York, United States. This airport is currently closed indefinitely.

Facilities 
Olcott-Newfane Airport covers an area of 60 acres (24 ha) at an elevation of 315 feet (96 m) above mean sea level. It has two runways with turf surfaces: 9/27 is 2,500 by 60 feet (762 x 18 m) and 6/24 is 2,408 by 30 feet (734 x 9 m).

References

External links 
 Aerial image as of March 1995 from USGS The National Map
 

Airports in New York (state)
Transportation buildings and structures in Niagara County, New York